The 2017 Boylesports Irish Greyhound Derby took place during August and September with the final being held on 23 September at Shelbourne Park.

The prize money on offer was be €240,000 of which €150,000 went to the winner Good News, trained by Patrick Guilfoyle, owned by Sandra Guilfoyle and Mary Kennedy and bred by John Kennedy. The competition was sponsored by Boylesports.

Final result 
At Shelbourne Park (over 550 yards):

Distances 
2, 2, 3, 2½, 4 (lengths)

Competition report 
2017 English Greyhound Derby finalist Clares Rocket was once again the ante-post favourite as he was during the 2016 Irish Greyhound Derby. The British challenge was headed by the Select Stakes champion Dorotas Wildcat. The first round took place on 17/18/19 August with the fastest winner being the Graham Holland pair of Sonic (a finalist in 2016) in 29.12 and Clares Rocket in 29.16.

In the first eight heats of the second round Good News set the best time of 29.49 and Sonic recorded a second success, as did Typical Ash. The second eight heats saw Produce and Laurels champion Clonbrien Hero record 29.41 before Clares Rocket won in 29.15. Kilgraney Ace also went well, winning in 29.36.

The 2016 English Greyhound Derby champion Jaytee Jet won his third round heat but it was Clares Rocket who was once again the fastest with a 29.58 win to remain unbeaten. Tyrur Harold, Sonic and Droopys Cabaye also remained unbeaten going into the quarter finals. Dorotas Wildcat was an unfortunate withdrawal after picking up a shoulder injury.

In the quarter finals Sonic won a first messy heat in a time of 29.61 which was followed by an impressive win for Native Chimes from Kilgraney Ace in 29.44. The third quarter went to Black Farren who ended Tyrur Harold's unbeaten run and Jaytee Jet qualified by virtue of a third-place finish but Droopys Cabaye was eliminated. The final heat was won by Good News who surprisingly beat Clares Rocket.

Only Sonic remained unbeaten going into the semi-finals and his chances were enhanced when Clares Rocket was withdrawn lame, which explained the quarter final defeat. The first semi final provided a shock with Black Farren winning in 29.63 followed by Buckos Dream and Hey Bound. The heat favourites Native Chimes and Tyrur Harold were both eliminated. In the second semi final Good News defeated hot favourite Sonic in 29.49 and Jaytee Jet finished third to claim a final place.

The final was won by Good News who was fast away from the traps and always led. Black Farren held onto second place holding off the strong finishing Sonic who had found trouble at the first bend along with the other competitors.

Quarter finals

Semi finals

See also 
2017 UK & Ireland Greyhound Racing Year

References 

Greyhound Derby
Irish Greyhound Derby
Irish Greyhound Derby
Greyhound racing competitions in Dublin (city)
Irish Greyhound Derby
Irish Greyhound Derby, 2017